Cheilosia mutabilis is a European  species of hoverfly. Like most Cheilosia it is black, and because of this may often be overlooked as a hoverfly. It is little recorded, and is considered rare and scarce throughout most of its range.

References

Diptera of Europe
Eristalinae
Insects described in 1817